|}

The Prix Jean Romanet is a Group 1 flat horse race in France open to thoroughbred fillies and mares aged four years or older. It is run over a distance of 2,000 metres (about 1¼ miles) at Deauville in August.

History
The event is named in memory of Jean Romanet (1914–2003), a prominent figure in French racing. He devoted much of his life to the Société d'Encouragement, and served as general manager of the organisation from 1961 to 1986.

The Prix Jean Romanet was established in 2004, and it initially held Group 2 status. It was one of several new races designed to keep more fillies from being exported or prematurely retired to stud.

The race was promoted to Group 1 level in 2009.

Records
Most successful horse (2 wins):
 Satwa Queen – 2006, 2007

Leading jockey (3 wins):
 Frankie Dettori – Folk Opera (2008), Ribbons (2014), Coronet (2019)

Leading trainer (3 wins):
 James Fanshawe – Ribbons (2014), Speedy Boarding (2016), Audarya (2020)

Leading owner (2 wins):
 Steven & Gillian Lamprell – Satwa Queen (2006, 2007)
 Khalid Abdullah – Announce (2011), Romantica (2013)
 Helena Springfield Ltd – Izzi Top (2012), Speedy Boarding (2016)

Winners

 Snow Fairy finished first in 2012, but she was later disqualified after testing positive for a banned substance.

See also
 List of French flat horse races

References

 Racing Post:

 france-galop.com – A Brief History: Prix Jean Romanet.
 galop.courses-france.com – Prix Jean Romanet – Palmarès depuis 2004.
 galopp-sieger.de – Prix Jean Romanet.
 horseracingintfed.com – International Federation of Horseracing Authorities – Prix Jean Romanet (2018).
 pedigreequery.com – Prix Jean Romanet – Deauville.

Middle distance horse races for fillies and mares
Deauville-La Touques Racecourse
Horse races in France
2004 establishments in France
Recurring sporting events established in 2004